Os Homens São de Marte... E é pra Lá que Eu Vou! ( Men Are From Mars ... And That's Where I'm Going!)  is a 2014 Brazilian comedy film directed by Marcus Baldini, adapted from a play of the same name written and starred by Mônica Martelli. The film's cast includes Paulo Gustavo, Daniele Valente, Eduardo Moscovis, Marcos Palmeira, Humberto Martins, José Loreto, Herson Capri, Peter Ketnath, Irene Ravache and Julia Rabelo.

The film follows the story of Fernanda (Martelli), who abandoned her personal life to devote herself to the career, and now, at the age of 39,  starts thinking that is living in an emergency affective situation. From each new man passing on her life, she thinks to have found her perfect match. The play which the film is based spent nine years in theaters, with an audience of more than 2 million people.

Cast

 Mônica Martelli as Fernanda
 Paulo Gustavo as Aníbal
 Daniele Valente as Nathalie
 Marcos Palmeira as Tom
 Eduardo Moscovis as Juarez
 Herson Capri as Man at the Art Gallery
 Humberto Martins as Robertinho 
 Irene Ravache as Maria Alice
 Peter Ketnath as Nick
José Loreto as Marcelinho
Maria Gladys as Dona Dedé
Ana Lucia Torre as Aunt Sueli
Alejandro Claveaux
Júlia Rabello

References

External links
 

Brazilian comedy films
2014 comedy films
2014 films
Brazilian films based on plays
2010s Portuguese-language films